Amphicallia quagga is a moth of the  subfamily Arctiinae. It is found in Tanzania.

References

Endemic fauna of Tanzania
Moths described in 1909
Arctiini
Insects of Tanzania
Moths of Africa